Estadio Bragaña Garcia is a baseball stadium in Moca, Dominican Republic. This stadium can accommodate 4,000 spectators.

References

1970s establishments in the Dominican Republic
Baseball venues in the Dominican Republic
Softball venues in the Dominican Republic
Buildings and structures in Espaillat Province
Sports venues completed in the 1970s